The 2012–13 Ukrainian Premier League season was the 22nd since its establishment in 1991 and fifth since its reorganisation.

A total of sixteen teams participated in the league, the best 14 sides of the 2011–12 season and two promoted clubs from the 2011–12 Ukrainian First League. The season commenced on July 13, 2012 when Karpaty Lviv visited Lutsk and played a 1–1 draw against Volyn Lutsk. The competition had a winter break that began on 2 December and resumed on 1 March 2013 when Volyn Lutsk visited Donetsk and played against Shakhtar Donetsk. The ending date of the competition was 26 May 2013.

Henrikh Mkhitaryan from Shakhtar Donetsk set a new Ukraine Premier League record for number of goals scored in one season. It is the second season in the league when no clubs were relegated.

Teams

Promoted
FC Hoverla-Zakarpattya Uzhhorod, champion of the 2011–12 Ukrainian First League – (returning after absence of 2 seasons)
FC Metalurh Zaporizhya, runner-up of the 2011–12 Ukrainian First League – (returning after absence of a season)

Renamed teams
Prior to the start of the season Hoverla-Zakarpattya Uzhhorod was renamed to Hoverla Uzhhorod.

Location map

Stadiums

The following stadiums were used during the season:

Personnel and sponsorship

Managerial changes

Qualification to European competitions for 2013–14
 Since Ukraine finished in eighth place of the UEFA country ranking after the 2011–12 season, the league will have the same number of qualifiers for 2013–14 UEFA Europa League. The Ukrainian Cup winner qualifies for the play-off round.

Qualified Teams
 After the 21st Round, Shakhtar Donetsk qualified for European football for the 2013–14 season.
 During the 24th Round, Shakhtar Donetsk qualified for the 2012–13 UEFA Champions League.
 During the 25th Round, Metalist Kharkiv and Dynamo Kyiv qualified for European football for the 2013–14 season.
 During the 26th Round, Shakhtar Donetsk became champions and qualified for the 2012–13 UEFA Champions League group stage after a 1–1 draw against Metalist Kharkiv. (C)
 During the 27th Round, Dnipro Dnipropetrovsk qualified for European football for the 2013–14 season.
 After the Ukrainian Cup Semi Final, Chornomorets Odesa qualified for the 2013–14 UEFA Europa League as they will play in the 2012–13 Ukrainian Cup final against the champions of Ukraine, Shakhtar Donetsk, who have already qualified for the UEFA Champions League. 
 During the 28th Round, after Metalist Kharkiv won their fixture against Zorya Luhansk, Dnipro Dnipropetrovsk qualified for the 2013–14 UEFA Europa League. 
 After the 29th Round Metalist Kharkiv qualified for the 2012–13 UEFA Champions League and will enter into the third qualifying round.
 After the 29th Round Dynamo Kyiv qualified for the 2013–14 UEFA Europa League and will enter into the playoff round.
 After the 29th Round Metalurh Donetsk qualified for the 2013–14 UEFA Europa League.
 After Chornomorets Odesa were defeated in the Ukrainian Cup Final, Dnipro Dnipropetrovsk will enter into the playoff round, Metalurh Donetsk will enter in the 3rd qualifying round, Chornomorets Odesa will enter in the 2nd qualifying round of the 2013–14 UEFA Europa League.

League table

Results
The following table displays match results between each team in the competition.

Round by round
The following table represents the teams position after each round in the competition.

Season statistics

Top scorers

Top assists

Hat-tricks

Awards

Monthly awards

Season awards
The laureates of the 2012–13 UPL season were:
 Best player:  Henrikh Mkhitaryan (Shakhtar Donetsk)
 Best coach:  Mircea Lucescu (Shakhtar Donetsk)
 Best goalkeeper:  Maksym Koval (Dynamo Kyiv)
 Best arbiter:  Yuriy Mozharovsky (Lviv)
 Best young player:  Eduard Sobol (Shakhtar Donetsk)
 Best goalscorer:  Henrikh Mkhitaryan (Shakhtar Donetsk)

See also
2012–13 Ukrainian First League
2012–13 Ukrainian Premier League Reserves and Under 19
2012–13 Ukrainian Second League
2012–13 Ukrainian Cup
2012–13 UEFA Europa League
2012–13 UEFA Champions League

References

External links
Official website

Ukrainian Premier League seasons
1